Guards army may refer to:

 The Russian Guards (the Tsarist Russian Gvardiya and similar elite military units of modern Russia, Belarus, Ukraine, and the former Soviet Union.)
 A common translation for the Wuwei Corps of the late Qing dynasty in China

See also
List of army units called Guards